The Eastern Illinois Panthers football program is the intercollegiate American football team for Eastern Illinois University located in the U.S. state of Illinois. The team competes in the NCAA Division I Football Championship Subdivision (FCS) and is a member of the Ohio Valley Conference. The school's first football team was fielded in 1899. The team plays its home games at the 10,000 seat O'Brien Field, which is named after former head coach Maynard O'Brien.

History

The inaugural football team took the field only three weeks after the first students arrived on campus in 1899.

Affiliations

Classifications
 1960–1972: NCAA College Division (Small College)
 1973–1980: NCAA Division II
 1981–present: NCAA Division I FCS (Formerly Division I-AA)

Conference memberships
 1899–1911: Independent
 1912–1949: Illinois Intercollegiate Athletic Conference 
 1950–1969: Interstate Intercollegiate Athletic Conference
 1970–1972: NCAA College Division Independent
 1973–1977: NCAA Division II Independent 
 1978–1984: Association of Mid-Continent Universities
 1985–1995: Gateway Collegiate Athletic Conference/ Gateway Football Conference 
 1996–present: Ohio Valley Conference

Championships

National championships
Eastern Illinois has won one national championship, doing so in 1978. They also made an appearance in the Division II National Championship Game in 1980, losing 13–21 to Cal Poly.

Conference championships 

† Co-champion

Playoff appearances

NCAA Division I-AA/FCS playoffs
NCAA Division I Football Championship playoff appearances: 1982, 1983, 1986, 1989, 1995, 1996, 2000, 2001, 2002, 2005, 2006, 2007, 2009, 2012, 2013, 2015
All time playoff results

NCAA Division II playoffs
The Panthers made two appearances in the Division II playoffs, with a combined record of 5-1.

Bowl games
Eastern Illinois has participated in one bowl game, going 0–1.

All-time record vs. current OVC teams
Official record (including any NCAA imposed vacates and forfeits) against all current OVC opponents as of the completion of the 2021 season.

Rivalries

Illinois State

The Mid-America Classic is the rivalry game between Illinois State and Eastern Illinois. The rivalry began in 1901 and is the oldest in the state of Illinois. For the 100th game in the series, representatives from both schools met and developed the Mid-America Classic renaming for the rivalry. The two schools also collaborated on a traveling trophy, which holds plaques with the results of the previous 100 games in the series and has room for results of future games in the series. The two teams have played 110 times in total, with Illinois State holding a 59–42–9 advantage in the all-time series as of the end of the 2022 game.

Head coaches

# Interim head coach

Individual accomplishments

1st Team All Americans
Selectors: AP-Associated Press, AFCA-American Football Coaches Association, FBG-FB Gazette, SN-Sports Network, WC-Walter Camp Football Foundation

Award winners

 Walter Payton Award
Tony Romo - 2002
Jimmy Garoppolo - 2013
Walter Payton Award finalists
Tim Lance - 1990...3rd
Willie High - 1994...15th
Tony Romo - 2000...11th
Tony Romo - 2001...10th
Jimmy Garoppolo - 2012...10th
Erik Lora - 2012...4th
Erik Lora - 2013...7th
Alexander Hollins - 2018...21st

College Football Hall of Fame members
Eastern Illinois has two inductees in the College Football Hall of Fame as of 2021.

Retired numbers

Future non-conference opponents 
Announced schedules as of September 7, 2022.

Notable former players
Notable alumni include the following.

 Evan Arapostathis
 Greg Brown
 Anthony Buich
 Tristan Burge
 Pete Catan
 Brad Childress
 Jake Christensen
 Jeff Christensen
 Frank Cutolo
 Rob DeVita
 Ron Ellett
 Ray Fisher

 Jimmy Garoppolo
 Jeff Gossett
 Kamu Grugier-Hill
 Mike Heimerdinger
 Lenny High
 Alexander Hollins
 Otis Hudson
 John Jurkovic
 Tim Kelly
 Andrew Manley
 Pascal Matla
 Ray McElroy
 Greg McMahon
 Randy Melvin
 John Moyer

 Ryan Pace
 Steve Parker
 Sean Payton
 Ted Petersen
 Tony Romo
 Micah Rucker
 Terrance Sanders
 Mike Shanahan
 Chris Szarka
 Jeff Thorne
 Chevon Walker
 Pierre Walters
 Chris Watson
 Chris Wilkerson

References

External links
 

 
American football teams established in 1895
1895 establishments in Illinois